The cup plant borer (Papaipema polymniae) is a species of moth of the family Noctuidae. It is found in North America, including Virginia, Massachusetts and New Hampshire.

The wingspan is about 40 mm.

The larvae feed on Polymnia uvedalis.

References

Moths described in 1917
Papaipema